Dr. B. D. Jatti Homoeopathic Medical College, Hospital and Post Graduate Research Centre is an organization under the Ministry of Ayurveda, Yoga & Naturopathy, Unani, Siddha, and Homeopathy (Department of AYUSH), Government of India. It is affiliated to the Rajiv Gandhi University of Health Sciences, Bengaluru, Karnataka and conducts the graduate degree course in Homeopathy and post-graduate degree courses in Homoeopathy. The college is attached with 60 bedded hospital.

History
Dr. B. D. Jatti Homeopathic Medical College was started in 1992 with an initial intake of 25 students. Later it was taken over by Dakshin Bharat Hindi Prachar Sabha, Dharwad. The intake of the college was increased to 100 from the year 2003–04. It has separate hostels for boys and girls.

Departments 
The departments are Anatomy, Human Physiology and Biochemistry, Homoeopathic Pharmacy, Pathology, Forensic Medicine and Toxicology, Surgery, Obstetrics and Gynaecology, Practice of Medicine, Community Medicine, Organon of Medicine and Homeopathic Philosophy, Homeopathic Material Medica, and Repertory.

B.H.M.S. degree course 
It is of 4 1/2 years duration plus compulsory internship of one year after passing the Final Degree Examination.

M.D(Hom.) - Post Graduate Degree Course 
A three years course that includes one year of house job, where the student becomes a resident on the campus and receives training.

See also
 Central Council of Homeopathy
 List of hospitals in India

References

External links
Dr. B D Jatti Homoeopathic Medical College Website
Dr. B D Jatti Homoeopathic Medical College on Facebook
Dr. B D Jatti Homoeopathic Medical College on Twitter

Homeopathic organizations
Educational institutions established in 1992
Homeopathic education
Ministry of AYUSH
1992 establishments in Karnataka